Black Tie Nights is a softcore drama anthology series which aired on Cinemax in the United States from 2004 to 2005.

This anthology show revolved around the adventures of Olivia Hartley and Cooper Snow who ran Black Tie dating service.  They were assisted by their geeky sidekick, Ryan Lundy.  Each week they would encounter new or returning customers and try to play matchmaker.  The first season had two main subplots that continued in each episode.  The first was the budding romance between Ryan and Cooper.  The second was Olivia getting over the loss of her husband and dating again.

In the second season, the show was retooled.  The anthology series was renamed Hollywood Sexcapades and the characters of Olivia and Cooper were said to be out of the country opening a new branch.  Candi Hicks, a recurring customer in the first season, became the new employee of Black Tie dating service.  She and Ryan (who was no longer nerdish) partnered to run the company, and the continuing subplot was the budding romance between these two characters.  Each week they would continue to try to play matchmaker to that episode's guest stars.

Cast
 Glen Meadows as Ryan Lundy
 Beverly Lynne as Candi Hicks
 Tiffany Bolton as Cooper Snow
 Amy Lindsay as Olivia Hartley

Episodes

Season 1 (2004)
 "Date and Switch" – June 4, 2004
 "Naughty and Nice" – June 11, 2004
 "Beauty and the Beach" – June 18, 2004
 "A Girl Thing" – June 25, 2004
 "The Sex Sense" – July 2, 2004
 "Luck Be a Lady" – July 9, 2004
 "Girl on Page 19" – July 16, 2004
 "Makeover" – July 23, 2004
 "Love is Blind" – July 30, 2004
 "The Legend" – August 6, 2004
 "Whose Thong Is It, Anyway?" – August 13, 2004
 "Internal Affairs" – August 20, 2004
 "Something Wilder" – August 27, 2004

Season 2 (2005)
 "Dutch Treat" – October 7, 2005
 "Competitive Juices" – October 14, 2005
 "Sexual Healing" – October 21, 2005
 "Confessions in the Dark" – October 28, 2005
 "Undercover Girl" – November 4, 2005
 "Mile High Club" – November 11, 2005
 "Pajama Club" – November 18, 2005
 "Sensational" – November 25, 2005
 "Chick Boxers" – December 2, 2005
 "Let's Play Doctor" – December 9, 2005
 "In Good Hands" – December 16, 2005
 "Sexperience" – December 23, 2005
 "Candi Hearts" – December 30, 2005

External links
 

2004 American television series debuts
2005 American television series endings
2000s American drama television series
2000s American romance television series
Cinemax original programming
Television series by Warner Bros. Television Studios
Erotic television series